Kelvin Curtis Torve (born January 10, 1960) is a former Major League Baseball and Nippon Professional Baseball First baseman, and current head coach of the American Legion Baseball Post 22 Hardhats in Rapid City, South Dakota. Torve batted left and threw right.

Minor leagues
Torve was drafted by the San Francisco Giants in the second round of the 1981 Major League Baseball draft. Over four seasons in the Giants' farm system, Torve batted .284 with 36 home runs and 227 runs batted in. On April 9,  he was traded to the Baltimore Orioles for minor league pitcher Tommy Alexander. He batted .262 with 28 home runs and 150 RBIs over three seasons in the Orioles' farm system.

Minnesota Twins
After the  season, Torve signed as a Free agent with the Minnesota Twins. He spent most of the  season in triple A with the Portland Beavers, but came up to Minnesota in late June. He hit the only major league home run of his career on June 27 off the California Angels' Stew Cliburn. His only other RBI came on July 5 to blow a save for Hall of Fame closer Lee Smith. He went 3-for-16 in his one month stint with the Twins before returning to triple A in late July. He spent the entire  season in Portland, where he batted .291 with eight home runs and 62 RBIs.

New York Mets
Torve signed with the New York Mets for the  season. He made his Mets debut on August 7, and in his first Mets plate appearance, he was hit by a José DeJesús pitch. More importantly, he made his Mets debut wearing number 24. Then-team owner Joan Payson had promised Mays that the Mets would not reissue number 24, so that it would not be worn again by a player on a New York National League team in recognition of his years with the New York Giants. The number remained unofficially retired after Payson died and the team was sold by her family to Doubleday and Company and to Fred Wilpon, chairman of the board of Sterling Equities.

Equipment manager Charlie Samuels realized his mistake after receiving complaints from fans, and reissued Torve number 39 during the California road trip that began August 17. Torve kept the number for the remainder of the Mets' home stand, however, and batted .545 with two doubles and two RBIs in his short stint in Willie Mays' number. Number 39 batted .185 with no RBIs.

He had eight at bats without a hit.

Orix Blue Wave
In , Torve signed with the Orix BlueWave, where he became teammates with eighteen year old phenom Ichiro Suzuki. His first season in Japan got off to a slow start, but he turned it around, and led the team with a .305 batting average. His eleven home runs and 58 RBIs were third on the team (behind Satoshi Takahashi & Kazuhiko Ishimine in both cases). In his second season with Orix, Torve batted .232 with nine home runs and 35 RBIs.

References

External links
, or The Ultimate Mets Database
The Greatest 21 Days Interview: Part 1: Worked Harder, Part 2: Right Spot & Part 3: To Contribute

1960 births
Living people
Major League Baseball first basemen
Minnesota Twins players
New York Mets players
Orix BlueWave players
Clinton Giants players
Shreveport Captains players
Phoenix Giants players
Rochester Red Wings players
Charlotte O's players
Portland Beavers players
Tidewater Tides players
American expatriate baseball players in Japan
Baseball players from South Dakota
Sportspeople from Rapid City, South Dakota